Edward Mann Clark (12 April 1854 – 30 May 1933) was an Australian politician.

Born in Hobart to William and Selina Clark, he attended Oldfield's Commercial Academy until he was twelve, when he moved to Sydney following his father's death. On 24 January 1874 he married Mary Jenkins, with whom he had eight children; he would later remarry Emma Eileen Kirby on 6 August 1926. He was an alderman for East St Leonards from 1884 to 1890 and for North Sydney from 1890 to 1928. In 1891 he was elected to the New South Wales Legislative Assembly as a Labor member for St Leonards in 1891, joining the Free Trade Party in 1894 and serving until 1904 (as the member for Willoughby from 1894 to 1895) and again from 1907 to 1910 as an independent and member of the Single Tax League. Clark died at North Sydney in 1933.

References

 

1854 births
1933 deaths
Free Trade Party politicians
Independent members of the Parliament of New South Wales
Members of the New South Wales Legislative Assembly
Politicians from Hobart
Politicians from Sydney
Australian Labor Party members of the Parliament of New South Wales
Mayors of East St Leonards
Mayors of North Sydney
Deputy mayors of places in Australia